The 2012 Zimbabwe Twenty20 Triangular Series was a Twenty20 cricket tournament held in Zimbabwe. The tournament was originally scheduled as a 5-match Twenty20 series between Zimbabwe and South Africa. Bangladesh was included in this series at the request of the Bangladesh Cricket Board after Bangladesh's tour of Pakistan and Zimbabwe were postponed, leaving Bangladesh with no international cricket between March and September 2012. The matches in this series were not classified as official Twenty20 International matches, but instead classified as domestic t20 matches.

The tournament was won by Zimbabwe, who defeated South Africa by 9 wickets in the final in Harare.

Squads

Points table

Tour matches

Matches

1st match

2nd match

3rd match

4th match

5th match

6th match

Final

References

International cricket competitions in 2012